Paracryphia is a genus of a single species, Paracryphia alticola, a small tree or shrub endemic to New Caledonia in the family Paracryphiaceae. Its closest relative is Sphenostemon.

References

Monotypic asterid genera
Paracryphiales
Endemic flora of New Caledonia